Luko Zore (January 15, 1846 – November 26, 1906) was a philologist and Slavist from Dubrovnik. He was one of the leaders of the opposition to Austro-Hungarian Empire and Italy in Dubrovnik and a member of the Serb Catholic movement in Dubrovnik. Later in life he lived in Montenegro.

Biography

Luko Zore was born in Cavtat, son of Antun Zore and Marija Sabadin Pupiza. He published his first dramatic piece, "Pokora", in the journal Srđ, which he co-founded with Mr. and Mrs. Antun Fabris, and with the material and moral support of friends. It was his bold attempt at challenging the capricious Thalia (Muse), the muse of comedy. The play—a farce—is set in Cavtat, Zore's birthplace, in the nineteenth century.

At that time there were two major intellectual trends in Dubrovnik as well as in the whole of Dalmatia: one favoured the union of all the Slavic peoples, believing that they were of one nation (Illyrian movement), which was most prevalent in Dubrovnik. Luko Zore took an active part of all the Slavic associations available in that time in Dubrovnik, trying to fight the foreign political power and attempted to develop the idea of a national identity of the language and Slavic origins. Zore was a professor in the highest educational institution in Zadar. In 1878 Niko Pucić, Pero Budmani, Antun Paško Kazali, Ivan August Kaznačić, Jovan Sundečić, and Vuk Vrčević founded the review "Slovinac", dedicated mainly to literature and the arts. Luko Zore was seconded by Medo Pucić to be its editor for the next seven years. Officially, "Slovinac" was the organ of the Serb-Catholic Circle, whose president at the time was Medo Pucić. The periodical was discontinued in 1884, even though it had a good circulation and an excellent reputation in Dalmatia.

In March 1879, the politicians in Dalmatia came to a compromise and with their, so-called, Land's Government established the position of school trustee and appointed professor Luko Zore to the prestigious post of školskog savjetnika. Prior to being chosen, Zore had proposed Zemaljski jezik (Land's language), a new name for Serbo-Croatian, the language spoken by the majority of the people of Dalmatia.

His good friends and colleagues Risto Kovačić and the Pucić brothers (Niko Pucić and Medo Pucić) encouraged Luko Zore to enter politics as their representative in the Dalmatinski sabor (Diet of Dalmatia). He was elected in 1883.

A year later, on 30 January 1884, he became a member of the Serbian Learned Society, Srpsko učeno društvo, and corresponding member of the Serbian Royal Academy, better known as Srpske kraljevske akademije, on the 4th of February 1899.

A new literary journal appeared in Dalmatia called Srđ, founded by Antun Fabris in 1902. Luko Zore was its first editor. That year he allowed a controversial poem entitled "Bokeška noć" (Boccan night) by Uroš Trojanović to be published in Srđ, which got him immediately into trouble with the Austrian authorities. He was interrogated and incarcerated for two months, along with writers Antun Fabris, Antun Pasarić and poet Uroš Trojanović. The four were released in time for Christmas 1902. (Srđ as a review continued for another two years after Zore's death, but in 1908 it was discontinued). Zore's daughter Amalija (1875-1957) married marquis  (1863-1940).

Zore died in Cetinje, Montenegro in 1906. He was 60. Luko Zore was later re-buried in Dubrovnik's Cemetery Boninovo.

Works 
 Dubrovnikers are Serbs (Dubrovčani su Srbi), 1903, Dubrovnik.
 "Pokora", a farce written in Dubrovnik in 1905.
 "Naš jezik tijekom naše književnosti u Dubrovniku" (Our language in the course of our literature in Ragusa), Dubrovnik, 1871.

References

 Jovan Skerlić, Istorija nove srpske književnosti / History of Modern Serbian Literature (Belgrade, 1921) p. 363.

1846 births
1906 deaths
People from Konavle
People from the Kingdom of Dalmatia
Serbian writers
Serbian philologists
Slavists
Serb-Catholic movement in Dubrovnik
Book and manuscript collectors
Serbs of Croatia